The men's 50 kilometres walk event at the 1967 Pan American Games was held in Winnipeg on 4 August. It was the first time since the inaugural 1951 edition that this event was featured at the Games.

Results

References

Athletics at the 1967 Pan American Games
1967